Laurel Highlands High School is a public high school serving around 1,100 students in grades 9–12 from the outlying Uniontown, Pennsylvania city limits. Due to the campus' location, some students from Uniontown do attend Laurel Highlands for convenience.

Creation and history
Laurel Highlands High School was created in 1967 by merging rival high schools, North Union and South Union. Students attended high school in their respective buildings until completion of the current campus in 1972. Minor upgrades were performed to the school in 1994.  The most recent structural update was completed in 2015 with a $43 million renovation.

Academics
According to the schools Curriculum Guide students need 25.5 credits in order to graduate, as well as complete a graduation project and career portfolio.

Credit structure

Course offerings
 English
 Social Studies
 Science
 Mathematics
 Physical Education/Health/Aquatics
 World Language: Including courses in French, Spanish, and Foreign Cultures
 Business Education: Including tourism courses
 Air Force/JROTC
 Technology Education: Including courses in CADD, as well as an introductory course to the Natural Gas industry in the area.
 Family/Consumer Sciences
 Music
 Art
 Driver's Education

Vocational Education Opportunity
Students in Grades 10–12 have the opportunity to attend the Fayette County Career and Technical Institute in Georges Township for one-half day, each day while attending their home school the other half of the day.

Athletics

Notable alumni
Mark Esper, former U.S. Secretary of Defense 
Gus Gerard, former professional basketball player, Denver Nuggets, Detroit Pistons, and San Antonio Spurs
David Nehls, actor, singer, composer, and lyricist
Peter M. Rhee, surgeon
Wil Robinson, former ABA basketball player
Terry Mulholland, former professional baseball player, Philadelphia Phillies and other teams
Kaleb Ramsey, former professional football player, San Francisco 49ers
Gene Steratore, former National Football League referee

References

Public high schools in Pennsylvania
Schools in Fayette County, Pennsylvania
Educational institutions established in 1972
1972 establishments in Pennsylvania